Gharsallah, la semence de Dieu is a 2007 documentary film.

Synopsis 
At the beginning of the 19th century, a man called Gharsallah dies and is buried in a mausoleum in the village of Dhibet, in the center of Tunisia. The film tries to evoke how Gharsallah affected other lives: Was he Saint? A madman? Possessed? Unjust? The story of a man that marked everything around him, even dreams.

External links 

2007 films
Belgian documentary films
Tunisian documentary films
2007 documentary films